A number of places are named after the second guru of Sikhs, Guru Angad Dev ji.

Guru Angad Dev Veterinary and Animal Sciences University, Ludhiana, India
Guru Angad Dev Charitable Hospital, Ludhiana, India
Shri Guru Angad Dev College, Khadoor Sahib, India
Guru Angad Dev Ji International Gurumat Sangeet Academy, Ludhiana, India
Guru Angad Dev Educational and welfare society, Ludhiana, India
Guru Angad Dev College of Nursing, Ludhiana, India

References
Guru Angad Dev Veterinary and Animal Sciences University

Sikhism-related lists
Monuments and memorials in India
Guru Angad Dev